"Waiting for Love" is a song by Canadian hard rock supergroup Alias, released in 1991 as the third single from their self-titled debut album (1990). Written by Brett Walker and Jeff Paris, the song peaked at number 4 in Canada, and number 13 on the US Billboard Hot 100.

Charts

Weekly charts

Year-end charts

References

1990 songs
1991 singles
Alias (band) songs
EMI Records singles